Dodge Van may refer to:
 Dodge A100 and A108, a compact mid-engine van sold from 1964 to 1970
 Dodge B-series/Ram van, a full-sized van sold from 1971 to 2002
 Dodge Caravan, a minivan sold from 1984 until 2020
 Dodge Sprinter, a van, chassis cab, and minibus built by Daimler AG